Théodore Duret (20 January 1838, Saintes – 16 January 1927, Paris) was a French journalist, author and art critic. He was one of the first advocates of Courbet, Manet, and the Impressionists. One of his best known works is Critique d'Avant Garde (Paris, 1885) which was written in support of the Impressionist movement. He also served as collecting advisor and buying agent for American art collector Louisine Havemeyer.

Biography
Theodore Duret was heir to a firm of Cognac dealers, was a collector, orientalist, and art critic.

Travels in Asia 
In September 1871, Duret traveled throughout Asia alongside the collector Henri Cernuschi. Together, the two men visited Japan, China, Mongolia, Java, and Indonesia in an effort to collect art objects and artworks. Duret was particularly interested in purchasing Japanese prints and illustrations. In collecting these objects, he sought to discover what he called "the real Japan." Upon his return to Paris, Duret published his Voyage en Asie in 1873, which documented the collector's travels and purchases throughout Asia. Although Duret recounts his personal travels inVoyage en Asie, he also comments on the family structures, languages, and religious practices of the countries he visited.

Whistler painting 
He was introduced to Whistler by Manet and posed for a portrait by Whistler in 1883 at Whistler's London studio at 13 Tite Street.  At Duret's request, Whistler painted him in full evening dress, but Whistler suggested that he hold a pink domino, an addition necessary to the decorative arrangement of the composition. Whistler worked on the portrait over a long period of time, even though the finished work ultimately looks like a rapid sketch. Acclaimed when exhibited at the Paris Salon of 1885, it was ranked by many as the best portrait of Duret painted by any of the great Realist artists of the period.

Works 
 
 
 
 
 Duret, Théodore (1919) Vincent Van Gogh. Bernheim Jeune et Cie.

References

Notes
Shigemi Inaga: Théodore Duret (1838–1927). Paris 1988
Jean Selz: Lexikon des Impressionismus Cologne 1977 
John Rewald: Die Geschichte des Impressionismus Cologne 1979 
Chang, Ting (2002). "Collecting Asia: Théodore Duret's "Voyage en Asie" and Henri Cernuschi's Museum". Oxford Art Journal. 25 (1): 17–34. ISSN 0142-6540.

External links

  The Havemeyer Family Papers relating to Art Collecting in The Metropolitan Museum of Art Archives. Theodore Duret acted as an art collecting advisor and buying agent for the Havemeyer family. This archival collection includes original letters from Duret to Louisine Havemeyer and to Duret from Paul Rosenberg.
 Article on the correspondence between Duret and James Abbott McNeill Whistler from The Metropolitan Museum of Art Libraries
 
 

1838 births
1927 deaths
People from Saintes, Charente-Maritime
19th-century French journalists
French male journalists
French art critics
Burials at Père Lachaise Cemetery
French male writers
19th-century French male writers